Niki Angeneta Wories (born 18 June 1996) is a retired Dutch figure skater. A six-time Dutch national champion, she has won five senior international medals and qualified for the free skate at three ISU Championships.

Personal life
Niki Wories was born on 18 June 1996 in Almere, Netherlands. She is the second daughter of Annelies and Paul Wories. She studied at the Johan Cruyff Academy before moving to Quebec, Canada.

Career
Wories began skating in 2001. She debuted on the international junior level in spring 2012 at the Coupe du Printemps.

Wories competed in her first ISU Junior Grand Prix event in August 2013. She was coached by Sylvia Holtes and András Száraz in Dordrecht and Zoetermeer at the start of the season, before switching to Astrid Tameling-Winkelman in Dordrecht.

Wories remained on the junior level in the first half of the 2014–15 season. In January 2015, she became the Dutch national senior champion. She then made her senior international debut at the 2015 European Championships in Stockholm, Sweden, but was eliminated after placing 31st in the short program. In February, Wories won senior bronze medals at the Bavarian Open and International Challenge Cup, where she also achieved the minimum technical score to compete at the senior World Championships. In March, she qualified for the free skate at the 2015 World Junior Championships in Tallinn, Estonia by placing 15th in the short program; she finished 23rd overall. Later that month, she competed at the 2015 World Championships in Shanghai, China – the first Dutch competitor at Worlds since 2010. Ranked 32nd in the short, she did not make the cut for the free skate.

Wories changed coaches in October 2015, joining Bruno Marcotte in Montreal, Canada. She reached the free skate at the 2016 European Championships in Bratislava, where she finished 20th, and at the 2016 World Championships in Boston, where she placed 22nd.

Wories underwent two operations due to bursitis in her foot. Having sustained a concussion in December 2016, she decided not to compete at the 2017 European Championships. According to a February 2017 report, she has sustained five concussions.

Wories was scheduled to make her World Championship return post-injury in 2020 in Montreal, but these were cancelled as a result of the coronavirus pandemic.

Wories' retirement from competition was announced on May 17, 2022. She was appointed the figure skating discipline manager for the Koninklijke Nederlandsche Schaatsenrijders Bond (Royal Dutch Ice Skaters Association) active June 1, 2022.

Programs

Competitive highlights 
CS: Challenger Series; JGP: Junior Grand Prix

References

External links 

 

1996 births
Dutch female single skaters
Living people
Sportspeople from Almere
20th-century Dutch women
21st-century Dutch women